In philosophy, ontological maximalism is a preference for largest possible universe, i.e. anything which could exist does exist.

See also 
Ontology
Maximalism
Large cardinal property
Continuum hypothesis
Mathematical universe hypothesis
Modal realism

Set theory
Ontology